Aulastomatomorpha phospherops, the Luminous slickhead, is a species of slickhead found in the Indian and West Pacific Oceans. This species grows to a length of  SL. This species is the only described member of the genus Aulastomatomorpha.

References
 

Alepocephalidae
Monotypic fish genera
Fish of the Pacific Ocean
Fish of the Indian Ocean